

History of the company
Haden Appliances, formerly a British motorcycle brand from Birmingham, A.H. Haden Motorcycles became “Haden Bros” after Donald William Haden and Denis Howard Haden, took over the business after 1937. Haden, as the appliance brand was founded in 1958 after Denis Howard Haden founded his own, separate company, D.H. Haden Ltd. to focus his efforts on manufacturing kettles.

Haden was purchased by Pifco in the year 2000, and production at the company's Lichfield factory ceased the following year. After Pifco was itself taken over later in 2001, the brand fell under the ownership of US companies Salton Group and Spectrum Brands before being sold to homewares business company Sabichi in 2016.

International sales 
Haden products retail in the UK and in 2019 product launched for the first time in the USA.

References

Home appliance brands